Kai Ishii (born 4 August 1993) is a Japanese rugby union player for the Sunwolves in Super Rugby. His position is wing.

Career
He scored a try on debut for the Sunwolves in their 41–31 loss to the Brumbies.

References

External links
Japan Rugby profile

1993 births
Japanese rugby union players
Sunwolves players
Rugby union wings
Living people
Toshiba Brave Lupus Tokyo players
Urayasu D-Rocks players